In military terms, 66th Division or 66th Infantry Division may refer to:

 Infantry divisions 
 66th Infantry Division (Bangladesh)
 66th Division (Imperial Japanese Army)
 66th Division (Spain)
 66th (2nd East Lancashire) Division, a unit of the British Army in the First World War
 66th Infantry Division (United Kingdom), a unit of the British Army in the Second World War
 66th Infantry Division (United States), a unit of the United States Army 

 Cavalry divisions 
 66th Cavalry Division (United States), a unit of the United States Army 

 Rifle divisions 
 66th Rifle Division, Red Army